Nanne Choda (12th century CE) was a famous Telugu poet and belongs to a family of Telugu Chodas. He holds the titles Tekanadityudu and Kaviraja Sikhamani. He is regarded as the first composer of Prabandha.

Biography
In his works he claims that his mother was from Haihaya family of Palanadu, chieftons to Velanati Chodas. He dedicated his work to Jangama Mallikarjuna Yogi, a Shaivite saint.

Works
Nanne Choda's famous work is Kumara Sambhavam in Telugu. Some believe this work to be composed in the 10th century before Nannaya's Mahabaratha. Others place Nannechoda between the period of Nannaya and Tikkana. Kumara Sambhavam is not the translation of Kalidasa's work of the same name. But Nannechodudu has drawn inspiration from Kalidasa's work as well as other stories of the Saivaite literature. He has dedicated his work to Jangama Mallikarjuna, who was his guru.

Style
He was the first writer in Prabandha style and earlier than Srinatha and Ashtadiggajas. He had used mixture of Sanskrit and Telugu words. He was master of Telugu idioms. Some of his poems describing nature are very popular. He had introduced new aspects in Telugu literature. He had written poems that does Sukavi Stuti (praise of good poets), Kukavi Ninda (blame the bad poets) and Ishtadeva Prardhana (praise of favourite god) in his works.

Nanne Choda is the first Telugu poet to use Kannada and Tamil words in his poetry.

Notes

References
 Durga Prasad, History of the Andhras up to 1565 A. D., P. G. PUBLISHERS, GUNTUR (1988)
Kumara Sambhavamu - Nannechoda Devakrutam

See also

Nannaya
Tikkana

12th-century Indian poets
Telugu poets
Telugu writers
Year of death unknown
Year of birth unknown
Indian male poets
People from Guntur district
Chola dynasty
Poets from Andhra Pradesh